There has been a Head of the Northern Ireland Civil Service since Sir Ernest Clark was appointed the first holder of that office in 1921. As of 2017 and according to the Executive Office, the Head of the 23,500-people strong NICS "has primary leadership responsibility for creating, developing and sustaining the NICS as an organisation which serves the devolved administration, the institutions of government and the people of Northern Ireland through the provision of high quality, cost effective services." The incumbent is also Permanent Secretary of the Executive Office and Secretary to the Northern Ireland Executive, making the office-holder the "most senior adviser to the First Minister and the deputy First Minister".

List of Heads of the Northern Ireland Civil Service
 1921–1925: Sir Ernest Clark
 1925–1944: Lt-Col. Sir Wilfred Spender
 1944–1953: Sir William Dalgliesh Scott
 1953–1961: Sir Douglas Alexander Earsman Harkness
 1961–1965: Sir Richard Frederick Roberts Dunbar
 1965–1970: Sir Cecil Joseph Bateman
 1970–1976: Sir David Charles Beresford Holden
 1976–1979: Sir Robert Hill Kidd
 1979–1984: Sir Ewart Bell
 1984–1991: Sir Kenneth Bloomfield
 1991–1997: Sir David Fell
 1997–2000: Sir John Semple
 2000–2002: Sir Gerry Loughran
 2002–2008: Sir Nigel Hamilton
 2008-2011: Sir Bruce Robinson
 2011–2017: Sir Malcolm McKibbin
 2017–2020: Sir David Sterling
 December 2020 – 2021: Jenny Pyper (Temporary interim Head) 
 September 2021 – Present: Jane Brady

References

1921 establishments in Northern Ireland
 
Civil service positions in the United Kingdom
Lists of political office-holders in Northern Ireland